Wang Zhong (王忠; 1359 – 23 September 1409) was a Chinese marquis under the Yongle Emperor of the Ming dynasty. He was killed in Qiu Fu's impetuous cavalry attack on the retreating Tartars alongside marquis Wang Cong, Li Yuan, Qoryocin and Qiu Fu himself.

References

1359 births
1409 deaths